School of Comedy is a British character-based comedy sketch show which was turned into a television show after a successful run of review shows at the Edinburgh festival.

The cast was entirely made up from members of the after-school drama club of The Harrodian School in London, run by teacher Laura Lawson.

The show comprised sketches involving a very diverse group of characters; from a lesbian couple in 1940s war-time Britain, to a pair of South-African security guards. The show is different from other comedy sketch shows because even though the show's content is mature enough to need to be shown after the watershed, the roles were all played by school-aged performers.

The show ran for two series on E4 from 1 October 2009 to 18 October 2010.

The show has been credited with starting the careers of Will Poulter, Charlie Wernham and Jack Harries. Poulter has gone on to star in films such as The Chronicles of Narnia: The Voyage of the Dawn Treader and We're the Millers, while Harries went on to start a YouTube channel named "JacksGap", which had over 4 million subscribers and made Harries both well-known and popular on the internet. Wernham has gone on to play parts in Bad Education, Some Girls and The Inbetweeners, and Robbie Roscoe in Hollyoaks. Beth Rylance has since had a lead role in The Ministry of Curious Stuff and has had various guest and advertising roles.

Cast / Character(s) 

Africa Nile
Lilly Lucia Ainsworth
Ella Ainsworth
Grace Vance
Max Langdale Brown
Joe Taylor
Hector McCormick
Charlie Wernham
Evie Henderson
Arthur Sturridge
Olivia Archer-Deakin
Lacey-Ann Walsh
Finn Harries

References

External links

School of Comedy at E4.com
School of Comedy The actual 'School of Comedy' in London

School of Comedy stage clip from Comedy Shuffle on BBC YouTube channel
Matthewman, Scott (25 August 2010). "School of Comedy: The Stage Podcast #72". The Stage Online. Retrieved on 26 August 2010.

2009 British television series debuts
2010 British television series endings
2000s British television sketch shows
2010s British television sketch shows
E4 sketch shows
Television series by Left Bank Pictures